Public Interest Research Group in Michigan (PIRGIM) is a non-profit organization that is part of the state PIRG organizations.

PIRGIM has a history of working on a variety of issues, such as cleaning Michigan's waterways, toy safety, and chemical safety.

History
The PIRGs emerged in the early 1970s on U.S. college campuses. The PIRG model was proposed in the book Action for a Change by Ralph Nader and Donald Ross. 
Among other early accomplishments, the PIRGs were responsible for much of the Container Container Deposit Legislation in the United States, also known as "bottle bills."

Notable members and alumni

Phil Radford

Affiliate organizations
The Fund for Public Interest Research
Environment Michigan

References

External links
U.S. Public Interest Research Group (U.S. PIRG)
The Student PIRGs
The Public Interest Network

Non-profit organizations based in Michigan
Public Interest Research Groups
Renewable energy commercialization
Environmental ethics
Consumer rights activists